Murder at 1600 is a 1997 American action thriller film directed by Dwight Little and starring Wesley Snipes and Diane Lane.

Plot
In a restroom in the White House, a janitor finds secretary Carla Town dead. Metropolitan Police homicide detective Harlan Regis, whose apartment block is awaiting demolition in favor of a parking lot, is put on the case. At the White House, Regis is introduced to U.S. Secret Service Director Nick Spikings, National Security Advisor Alvin Jordan, and Secret Service agent Nina Chance. Spikings assigns Chance, a former Olympic gold-medal sharpshooter, to keep an eye on Regis.

Parallel to this, the White House has to deal with an impending international crisis: President Jack Neil has been trying to deal with a situation where American servicemen are being held hostage in North Korea, and some people—including several members of his inner circle, led by Vice President Gordon Dylan—think that Neil is not handling it the right way. Some people think that Neil should send troops to North Korea to rescue the hostages, but he does not want to risk a potential second Korean War.

White House janitor Cory Allen Luchessi was apparently unaccounted for on the night of the murder and had once made a pass at Carla. He is arrested and questioned, but his testimony and a clearly set-up piece of evidence lead Regis to suspect that the Secret Service may be involved. That night, Regis finds his apartment burglarized; the culprit escapes, and in a subsequent search, a hidden bug is found.

In a picture of Carla, Regis sees Burton Cash, the Secret Service agent assigned to Kyle Neil, the president's son. Regis figures out that Kyle had sex with Carla on the night of the murder. At a dance club, Regis talks with a young woman who says that Kyle once bragged that he once shared a mistress with his father. Carla's uncle's company, Brookline Associates, is the president's leading East Coast fundraiser, and also owns the apartment that Carla lived in.

Regis eventually discovers that Chance once was Kyle's bodyguard herself. When he confronts her, Chance explains that one night she discovered Kyle beating up his girlfriend. The Secret Service covered up the beating so that Kyle would not be arrested for assault, and Chance asked to be reassigned and was replaced by Cash. Upon being confronted by Regis, Kyle denies that he murdered Carla, but provides a special piece of information: among the bookings she made, Carla supposedly also ordered a car - despite not having a driver's license. Later on, Regis and Chance discover that the most recent entries in Carla's appointment book were forged.

With some clues left by Jordan, Regis finds out that Spikings has withheld several surveillance tapes from the night of the murder. Regis goes to Spikings' residence to question him; Spikings is willing to show the tape but is suddenly killed by a sniper. However, Regis and Chance escape the gunfire with the tape. They learn that Jordan engineered the murder in order to blackmail Neil into resigning, which would allow Dylan to assume office and have troops sent to North Korea.

Regis, Chance, and Regis's partner Stengel enter the White House tunnels. The sniper pursues them and wounds Stengel, but Chance manages to kill him. Pursued by the Secret Service, Regis just barely manages to get in contact with Neil and present him with the evidence of Jordan's conspiracy. Jordan attempts to shoot Neil, after being punched in the face, only for his shot to be intercepted by a handcuffed Chance, and he is killed by the Secret Service. Chance and Stengel are brought to a hospital, where they recover from their injuries. In gratitude for his rescue, Neil asks Regis if there is anything he can do, whereupon Regis brings up his impending eviction.

Cast

Production

Development
Producer Arnold Kopelson was attracted to Murder at 1600, having said that "lately, the White House has been vulnerable to a surprisingly wide variety of assaults," and along with producer Arnon Milchan offered the script to director Dwight Little, who accepted as despite his action film experience he had never made a suspense film, "and political thrillers are probably my favorite movie genre; I love those seminal conspiracy movies of the '70s."

Casting
The filmmakers then invited Wesley Snipes, considering him to have the physicality, intelligence and humor required for Harlan Regis, and Snipes accepted for the depth of the character and "the opportunity to do a suspense role, which is usually reserved for more mature actors." Diane Lane was attracted by the role of Agent Chance because "she stands by her personal code," and Lane had the markswoman experience required for the role.

Filming
Although scenes were filmed in Washington, D.C., primary locations were in Toronto, Canada and nearby locations in Ontario. As Absolute Power was occupying the Oval Office set built for Dave, a new Oval Office was  built at Cinespace Film Studios in Kleinburg. The film crew made many visits to the White House for reference in making what production designer Nelson Coates described as "the most architecturally accurate" recreation of the room. The Oval Office still stands at the studio, and has been used in productions such as Dick and The Sentinel.

Release

Theatrical
Murder at 1600 premiered in Los Angeles, California on April 14, 1997.

Reception

Box office 
The film was a box office disappointment. It was No. 3 with $7,962,268 during its opening weekend, and went on to make a total of $25,804,707 in the US.

Critical response
Murder at 1600 received generally poor reviews from critics, as it holds a 32% rating on Rotten Tomatoes based on 34 reviews.

References

External links
 
 
 
 
 
 

1997 films
1997 action thriller films
1990s political thriller films
American police detective films
American political thriller films
Films about fictional presidents of the United States
Films about the United States Secret Service
Films directed by Dwight H. Little
Films produced by Arnold Kopelson
Films scored by Christopher Young
Films set in Washington, D.C.
Films set in the White House
Films shot in Toronto
Regency Enterprises films
Warner Bros. films
Films produced by Arnon Milchan
1990s English-language films
1990s American films